Massoud Rajavi (born 18 August 1948 – disappeared 13 March 2003) became the leader of the People's Mujahedin of Iran (MEK) in 1979. In 1985, he married Maryam Rajavi, who became the co-leader of the MEK. After leaving Iran in 1981, he resided in France and Iraq. He disappeared during the 2003 invasion of Iraq and it is not known whether he is still alive. This has left Maryam Rajavi as the public face of the MEK.

Biography 
 
Rajavi joined the MEK when he was 20 and a law student at the University of Tehran. He graduated with a degree in political law. Rajavi and the MEK actively opposed the Shah of Iran and participated in the 1979 Iranian Revolution.

During the Pahlavi regime, Rajavi was arrested by SAVAK and sentenced to death. Due to efforts by his brother, Kazem Rajavi, and various Swiss lawyers and professors, his sentence was reduced to life imprisonment. He was released from prison during the Iranian Revolution in 1979. After the revolution, Rajavi assumed leadership of the People's Mujahedin of Iran.

When Iran's first presidential election took place in 1980, Rajavi nominated himself and his own People's Mujahedin of Iran. He was endorsed by the People's Fedai, the National Democratic Front, the Democratic Party of Kurdistan, Komala and the League of Iranian Socialists. He was disqualified in the elections by Ayatollah Khomeini on the grounds that 'those who did not endorse the Constitution of the Islamic Republic of Iran could not be trusted to abide by that constitution'.

In 1981, when Ayatollah Khomeini dismissed President Abolhassan Banisadr and a new wave of arrests and executions started in the country, Rajavi and Banisadr fled to Paris from Tehran's airbase. Massoud Rajavi and Banisadr formed the National Council of Resistance of Iran (NCRI) "with the intent to replace the Khomeini regime with the 'Democratic Islamic Republic.'” As a form of agreement with the Islamic republic, in 1986 France's Prime Minister Jacques Chirac evicted the MEK out of France. Rajavi and approximately five to ten thousand MEK members were received by the Iraqi government. Rajavi moved to Iraq and set up a base on the Iranian border.

Electoral history

Disappearance 
Shortly after the Iraq War, Massoud Rajavi disappeared. His whereabouts remained unknown. In his absence, Maryam Rajavi has assumed his responsibilities as leader of the MEK. According to members of the NCRI, Massoud Rajavi is still alive and in hiding due to being a "prime target" of the Islamic regime, while other sources have said that he is presumed to be dead.

Iraqi 2010 arrest warrant 
In July 2010, the Iraqi High Tribunal issued an arrest warrant for 39 MEK members, including Rajavi, "due to evidence that confirms they committed crimes against humanity" by "involvement with the former Iraqi security forces in suppressing the 1991 uprising against the former Iraqi regime and the killing of Iraqi citizens". The MEK have denied the charges, saying that they constitute a "politically motivated decision and it's the last gift presented from the government of Nuri al-Maliki to the Iranian government". Back in 2005, a Patriotic Union of Kurdistan official asked for arrest and trial of Rajavi based on his organization's documentary evidence of the involvement.

Personal life 
Rajavi came from a prominent family. He received a degree in political law from Tehran University. His brother was Kazem Rajavi, Iran's ambassador to the United Nations in Geneva who held doctoral degrees from Universities in Paris and Geneva. They had three other brothers, Saleh (a cardiologist in France), Ahmad (a British-educated surgeon), and Hooshang (an engineer in Belgium).

Rajavi married fellow MEK member Ashraf Rabiei in summer 1980. Rabiei was regarded as "the symbol of revolutionary womanhood". She was surrounded and killed by the Islamic Revolutionary Guard Corps. His second wife was Abolhassan Banisadr's daughter, Firouzeh. Their marriage took place in October 1982 and the couple divorced in 1984, after Banisadr left the NCRI. Rajavi married Maryam Qajar Azodanlu (later known as Maryam Rajavi) in 1985. Rajavi has a son from his first wife, named Mostafa.

References

External links 

 

Possibly living people
Iranian activists
Missing people
1948 births
People's Mojahedin Organization of Iran members
People's Mojahedin Organization of Iran politicians
People of the 1991 uprisings in Iraq
People of the Iranian Revolution
Iranian revolutionaries
Exiles of the Iranian Revolution in France
Iranian emigrants to France
Iranian emigrants to Iraq
Fugitives wanted on crimes against humanity charges
Prisoners and detainees of Iran